Charles Pierrepont Henry Gilbert (August 29, 1861 – October 25, 1952) was an American architect of the late-19th and early-20th centuries best known for designing townhouses and mansions.

Background and early life
Born in New York City, Gilbert's family comes of English and New English ancestry. One of the members was Sir Humphrey Gilbert, to whom Queen Elizabeth I of England granted a patent for the colonization of North America. Sir Humphrey's ambitious plans ended when he was lost at sea with most of his company on his return voyage from the exploration of Newfoundland. Other members of the family, however, soon planted the name in North America.

His father was Loring Gilbert, a direct descendant of John Gilbert, the second son of Giles Gilbert of Bridgwater, Somerset, England, who came to America early in the 17th century and settled at Dorchester, near Boston, and died at Taunton, Massachusetts, in 1654. Loring Gilbert was a leading commission merchant who had a successful career.  He married  Caroline C. Etchebery, and they had one son, Charles Pierrepont Henry Gilbert. Loring Gilbert died in 1893.

C. P. H. Gilbert received a careful education, studying both in America and in Europe, such as the École des Beaux-Arts in Paris. After being prepared for college he took courses in civil engineering and architecture, and later studied painting, sculpture and the fine arts in general. After college, he began practical work as an assistant in the office of a prominent firm of architects, where he received the training necessary to prepare him for engaging in his own business. As a young man he designed buildings in the mining towns of Colorado and Arizona before returning to New York around 1885.

Career 
In 1886, at the age of twenty-five, Gilbert began practicing as an architect in New York City, and received commission to design buildings of all kinds. One of Gilbert's first projects was the design of fourteen brownstone rowhouses that now form a part of the Manhattan Avenue Historic District. Gilbert designed the block for Hoboken developer John Brown in 1886.

Another noteworthy building was the 1888 Richardsonian Romanesque mansion at Eighth Avenue and Carroll Street in Park Slope, Brooklyn for Thomas Adams Jr., a chewing gum magnate. From 1893 on, Gilbert had a very large business, which grew steadily. In addition, he was a director or a stockholder in a number of large manufacturing companies outside of New York.

He saw action during the Spanish–American War of 1898. After the war he returned to New York.

By 1900 Gilbert had a reputation as a specialist in designing opulent townhouses and mansions. Among Gilbert's Fifth Avenue palazzi is the 1905 Neo-Renaissance mansion of Morton Freeman Plant, son of railroad tycoon Henry B. Plant. Through the 1920s he designed more than 100 New York City mansions in various styles; several of them along Fifth Avenue have now been re-purposed for institutional use.  In education, client list and architectural style, Gilbert largely followed in the footsteps of Richard Morris Hunt, whose petit château on Fifth Avenue for William Kissam Vanderbilt set a model for French Late Gothic limestone châteaux to house the elite of the Gilded Age. Amongst Gilbert's clients were wealthy and influential industrialists and bankers such as Harry F. Sinclair, Joseph Raphael De Lamar, Felix M. Warburg, Otto H. Kahn, Adolph Lewisohn, Augustus G. Paine, Jr. and families such as the Baches, Reids, Wertheims, Sloanes and other. Gilbert also designed a number of mansions and buildings on Long Island and in upstate New York in the 1920s.

Gilbert retreated from public life, and by the late 1920s stopped designing any new houses. He retired to Pelham Manor, New York in Westchester County, where he died on October 25, 1952 at his home on 216 Townsend Avenue, at the age of 92. He is interred at Woodlawn Cemetery in The Bronx, New York City.

Memberships 
Gilbert was a member of numerous professional and social organizations, amongst them the Chamber of Commerce of the State of New York, the Architectural League, the Society of Colonial Wars, the General Society of the Sons of the Revolution, the New England Society, and the Fine Arts, Metropolitan, Union League, Lawyers', Riding, Racquet, Ardsley, Colonial, Country, and Nassau Country clubs of New York. He also was a Fellow of the American Institute of Architects, and a veteran of Squadron A, the cavalry organization of the New York National Guard.

Family 
Gilbert was married to Florence Cecil Moss, daughter of Theodore Moss of New York City, and had two children: Dudley Pierrepont Gilbert and Vera Pierrepont Gilbert. He lived at 33 Riverside Drive and had a villa in Newport, Rhode Island at Ochre Point.

Works 
Some of Gilbert's works include:

1881 – Jules S. Bache residence, 10 East 67th Street, remodeled in 1889.
1886 – Fourteen brownstowne rowhouses in the Manhattan Avenue Historic District: 120-40 Manhattan Avenue, 39-43 West 105th Street, 38-44 West 106th Street
1888-1904 – at least eight of the Montgomery Place mansions (#11, 14, 16-19, 21, 25, 36-50, 54-60), between 8th Avenue and Prospect Park, Brooklyn
c.1889 – 313 and 315 Garfield Place, Brooklyn. Contrasting speculative houses.
c.1890 – Joseph Hanan residence, Carroll Street and 8th Avenue, Park Slope, Brooklyn; demolished in the 1930s
c.1895 – three adjoining mansions at the foot of Riverside Drive: 311 West 72nd Street, 1 Riverside Drive and 3 Riverside Drive for Philip Kleeberg
1898 – Harry F. Sinclair House, 79th Street and Fifth Avenue, now housing the Ukrainian Institute
1898 – Cushman Building, Broadway and Maiden Lane, 1898 (previously the site of the Howard Hotel)
1900 – "Meudon", the massive 80-room Louis XVI-style revival Gold Coast estate of William Dameron Guthrie in Lattingtown
c.1900 – Franklin Winfield Woolworth mansion, 80th Street and Fifth Avenue; demolished
c.1900 – Edmund C. Converse residence, 3 East 78th Street, in a "suave neo-Gothic", according to Christopher Gray; Converse was the first president of the Bankers Trust Company; his Greenwich, Connecticut estate is now known as Conyers Farm
1901 – Henry Seligman residence, 30 West 56th Street, now Aeffe USA
1903 – 57 Stone Street, built in the Dutch Colonial Revival style for Amos F. Eno, a son of Amos R. Eno
1904 – The Knabe Building, 437 Fifth Avenue
1905 – Joseph Raphael De Lamar House, Madison Avenue and 37th Street, now the Polish Consulate General
1905 – Edward Holbrook House, 4 East 52nd Street, now the Cartier Building
1906-1908 – Felix M. Warburg House, 92nd Street and Fifth Avenue, now the Jewish Museum
1913-1914 – Charlcôte House in Flat Rock Camp, constructed for Charlotte M. Bedell Paine; demolished 1980s
1914-1916 – Weckesser Hall, Wilkes University, Wilkes-Barre, Pennsylvania
1915-1918 – Mrs. Seymour H. Knox House, 800 Delaware Avenue (formerly 806), Buffalo, New York, now the offices of Cellino Law
1916-1918 – Otto H. Kahn House, 91st Street and Fifth Avenue, with architect J. Armstrong Stenhouse, now the Convent of the Sacred Heart
1917 – Adolph Lewisohn residence, 9 West 57th Street, demolished
1917 –  1067 Fifth Avenue, near 87th Street, apartment design in the French Gothic style
1917-1918 – Augustus G. Paine, Jr. residence, 31 East 69th Street, now Austrian Consulate General
1919-1921 – Arthur and Alice Sachs residence, 42 East 69th Street, now Jewish National Fund
1921 – Essex County National Bank, Willsboro (founded in 1923 by Augustus G. Paine, Jr., today part of Champlain National Bank)
1924-1925 – Seymour H. Knox II House, Buffalo, New York
1929-1930 – Paine Memorial Library, Willsboro

References

External links

 Pictures and Information on C.P.H. Gilbert's Historic Long Island Commissions
 Emporis page with list of commissions
 Gilbert, C. P. H. (1861-1952) // North Carolina Architects & Builders. A Biographical Dictionary (The NC State University Libraries).

C. P. H. Gilbert buildings
1861 births
1952 deaths
American neoclassical architects
American people of English descent
Architects from New York City
People from Pelham Manor, New York